Tsakhur (Tsakhur: ЦIaIх) is a rural locality (a selo) and the administrative centre of Tsakhurskoye Rural Settlement, Rutulsky District, Republic of Dagestan, Russia. The population was 476 as of 2010. There are 4 streets.

Geography 
Tsakhur is located in the valley of the Samur river, 35 km northwest of Rutul (the district's administrative centre) by road. Muslakh and Gelmets are the nearest rural localities.

Nationalities 

Tsakhurs live there.

Famous residents 
 Abdulla Mukhtarov (Doctor of Physical and Mathematical Sciences, associate Professor, Professor of the Physics Department of the Azerbaijan State University)
 Selim Dzhafarov (Caucasian scientist, linguist and Turkologist, professor at Baku State University)

References 

Rural localities in Rutulsky District